Steffani is the name of:

Surname 
Agostino Steffani (1654–1728), Italian ecclesiastic, diplomat and composer
Luigi Steffani (1828–1898), Italian painter

Given name 
Steffani Brass (born 1992), American actress
Steffani Jemison (born 1981), American artist
Steffani Otiniano (born 1992), Peruvian footballer

See also 
 Stefani (disambiguation)
 Stephani